The 2014 Bulgarian Cup Final was the 74th final of the Bulgarian Cup. The match, contested by Botev Plovdiv and Ludogorets Razgrad, took place on 15 May 2014 at Lazur Stadium in Burgas. Ludogorets won the final 1–0, claiming their second ever Bulgarian Cup title.

Route to the Final

Match

Details

Supporter disturbances

The match was affected by a number of disruptions due to unruly spectators. On the one-hour mark, shortly after Bezjak had opened the scoring, the advertisement boards near the stadium sector with the Botev ultras caught fire, necessitating the interruption of the match for 17 minutes until fire brigades could enter the pitch and extinguish the flames. On two occasions (around the 60th minute and following Vander Vieira's dismissal for a dangerous tackle on Mihail Aleksandrov), small groups of Botev supporters attempted pitch invasions, but were successfully restrained by footballers Veselin Minev, Tomáš Jirsák and Adam Stachowiak as well as the arriving police officers. A number of objects were also thrown by fans of the "canaries", with one of them hitting Ludogorets defender Georgi Terziev. Officials affiliated with the Razgrad team have been critical of the general preparations prior to the match and the insufficient policing. Botev owner Tzvetan Vassilev promised to compensate Chernomorets Burgas in full for all the stadium damage inflicted.

See also
2013–14 A Group

References

Bulgarian Cup finals
Cup Final
Botev Plovdiv matches
PFC Ludogorets Razgrad matches